FRAM is an American brand of automotive replacement parts offering oil filters, air filters, fuel filters, and similar products. 
 
As of 1936, FRAM produces original equipment for automotive manufacturers.

History
FRAM was founded by T. Edward Aldham and Frederick Franklin in 1932, to develop a replaceable oil filtering element. FRAM incorporated in 1934, averaging a production of 10 filters per day. In 1945, FRAM received the Army-Navy "E" Award becoming the exclusive manufacturer for filter development. In 1973, FRAM opened the industry's largest filtration engineering and research facility.

Advertising
FRAM introduced its first slogan, “The Dipstick Tells the Story” in 1942. FRAM introduced its iconic slogan, “You can pay me now, or pay me later” in 1971.

References

External links
 Official website

American brands
American companies established in 1932
Companies based in Cleveland